Venusia planicaput is a moth in the family Geometridae first described by Hiroshi Inoue in 1987. It is found in Nepal and China.

References

Moths described in 1987
Venusia (moth)